Presentism may refer to:

 Presentism (literary and historical analysis)
 Philosophical presentism

See also
 Presenteeism